St. John's Cathedral also known as the St. John the Divine, the Cathedral Church of the Diocese of North Eastern Caribbean and Aruba, is an Anglican church perched on a hilltop in St. John's, Antigua and Barbuda.  It is the seat of the Diocese of the North East Caribbean and Aruba in the Church in the Province of the West Indies.

The present cathedral with its imposing white twin towers was built on a fossilized reef, in 1845, and is now in its third incarnation, as earthquakes in 1683 and in 1745 destroyed the previous structures. The iron gates on the south face of the church are flanked by pillars displaying Biblical statues of St John the Divine and St John the Baptist. They were reportedly taken in 1756 from a French ship destined for Martinique.

History

The present church is the successor cathedral built in the same location where two other churches had existed one after the other. The first St. John's Anglican Church built here in 1681 was a simple wooden structure, devoid of any decorations. This was severely damaged in the earthquake in 1745. The second, much larger church was built in 1746 of English bricks. The architect of this church was Robert Cullen. It had a short steeple from the western end.

Nearly a century later, the Diocese of Antigua was established in 1842, and St. John's designated its cathedral. Soon thereafter, however, in February 1843, an earthquake caused serious damage to the church. The church was partially restored, and the first Bishop of Antigua, Daniel Davis.

Adjoining the old church, which was damaged, a new cathedral was planned and construction began on October 9, 1845, after Sir Charles Augustus FitzRoy, Governor of Antigua laid the foundation stone. At the end of three years of construction the new cathedral started its first divine service, with the consecration taking place on July 25, 1848. The new church was reportedly able to accommodate a congregation of 2,200.

The present history of the church has been acclaimed by a citizen of Antigua, a centenarian, in his memoirs who has said, "the planters called the Cathedral 'Big Church' and that it frightened the people as a symbol of English power. He also said that the Anglican Church catered more for the planter class, but the black people got more involved at about the time of World War I. At last some black persons’ names were memorialized on the cathedral's walls."

In 2008, it was reported that the church is in a state of disrepair and that a renovation project has been in the pipeline for several years. Also affected is the large cemetery of the church which is often used as something of a park during lunch breaks by Antiguan workers.

Architecture

The cathedral was designed by the architect Thomas Fuller of Bath, England, and raised at the highest point in St. John's town. F.W. Rowe of Bristol was in charge of the construction. The cathedral is seen now as an impressive landmark providing a panoramic view of the island.

The building is made from freestone, with stained glass windows and dark pitch pine furnishings. A unique feature in the cathedral is the pitch pine interior structure and cladding to provide lateral reinforcing for earthquake or hurricane loads. As a result that the cathedral is known by the epithet "a building within a building." This design had invited derision when built as representing "a pagan temple with two dumpy pepper pot towers", while now it is extolled as the best cathedral in the West Indian province. The interior decor of the church is dominated by dark pine furnishings and marble tablets on the walls, some of them were salvaged after earthquakes from the old churches that stood on the spot.

The entrance iron gate from the southern side into the cathedral, which was erected in 1789, is flanked by two imposing statues, one of St John the Divine and the other of St John the Baptist in flowing robes. It is said that these statues were confiscated by the British navy from the French ship Temple in Martinique waters in 1756 during the Seven Years' War and moved to this church. At the time of erection, the edifice was criticized by ecclesiastical architects as being like "a pagan temple with two dumpy pepper pot towers", however, in more recent times the same edifice has been given the accolade as "the most imposing of all the Cathedrals of the West Indian Province."

List of deans

References

External links

Buildings and structures in St. John's, Antigua and Barbuda
Cathedrals in Antigua and Barbuda
Anglican cathedrals in the Caribbean
Churches completed in 1845
Baroque church buildings
Baroque architecture in Antigua and Barbuda